Francis Borgia College, Gandia, is a private Catholic multilingual nursery through secondary school (ESO), located in Gandia, Valencia, Spain. The origins of the school date to 1543 and is run by the Society of Jesus.The school shares space with the Jesuit community and the Ducal Palace of Gandia.

See also

 Education in Spain
 List of Jesuit schools

References  

Jesuit primary schools in Spain
Jesuit secondary schools in Spain
Schools in Valencia
Educational institutions established in the 15th century
1543 establishments in Spain